KKMA (99.5 FM, "Classic Rock 99.5") is a radio station broadcasting a classic rock format. The station is licensed to Le Mars, Iowa, and serves Sioux City, Iowa. KKMA is owned by Powell Broadcasting.

History
KKMA signed on in 1989 with an oldies format known as "Kool 99.5". Kool 99.5 later morphed into classic hits by 2004, and classic rock by 2006 successfully competing with Clear Channel's KSEZ "Z98" for the lucrative upper demographics in Sioux City and continues to do so.

External links

Companies based in Iowa
Classic rock radio stations in the United States
Radio stations established in 1989
Iowa culture
1989 establishments in Iowa